The Maya peoples are an ethnolinguistic group of indigenous peoples of Mesoamerica. The ancient Maya civilization was formed by members of this group, and today's Maya are generally descended from people who lived within that historical region. Today they inhabit southern Mexico, Guatemala, Belize, El Salvador, and Honduras. "Maya" is a modern collective term for the peoples of the region; however, the term was not historically used by the indigenous populations themselves. There was no common sense of identity or political unity among the distinct populations, societies and ethnic groups because they each had their own particular traditions, cultures and historical identity.

It is estimated that seven million Maya were living in this area at the start of the 21st century. Guatemala, southern Mexico and the Yucatán Peninsula, Belize, El Salvador, and western Honduras have managed to maintain numerous remnants of their ancient cultural heritage. Some are quite integrated into the majority hispanicized mestizo cultures of the nations in which they reside, while others continue a more traditional, culturally distinct life, often speaking one of the Mayan languages as a primary language.

The largest populations of contemporary Maya inhabit Guatemala, Belize, and the western portions of Honduras and El Salvador, as well as large segments of population within the Mexican states of Yucatán, Campeche, Quintana Roo, Tabasco, and Chiapas.

Maya people of the Yucatan Peninsula 

One of the largest groups of Maya live in the Yucatan Peninsula, which includes the Mexican states of Yucatán State, Campeche, and Quintana Roo as well as the nation of Belize. These people identify themselves as "Maya" with no further ethnic subdivision (unlike in the Highlands of Western Guatemala).  They speak the language which anthropologists term "Yucatec Maya", but is identified by speakers and Yucatecos simply as "Maya". Among Maya speakers, Spanish is commonly spoken as a second or first language.
There is a significant amount of confusion as to the correct terminology to use—Maya or Mayan—and the meaning of these words with reference to contemporary or pre-Columbian peoples, to Maya peoples in different parts of Mexico, Guatemala, Belize, and to languages or peoples.

Linguists refer to the Maya language as Yucatec or Yucatec Maya to distinguish it from other Mayan languages. This norm has often been misinterpreted to mean that the people are also called Yucatec Maya; that term refers only to the language, and the correct name for the people is simply Maya (not Mayans). Maya is one language in the Mayan language family. Thus, to refer to Maya as Mayans would be similar to referring to Spanish people as Romantics because they speak a language belonging to the Romance language family. Confusion of the term Maya/Mayan as an ethnic label occurs because Maya women who use traditional dress identify by the ethnic term mestiza and not Maya.

Persons use a strategy of ethnic identification that Juan Castillo Cocom refers to as "ethnoexodus"—meaning that ethnic self-identification as Maya is quite variable, situational, and articulated not to processes of producing group identity, but of escaping from discriminatory processes of sociocultural marginalization.

The Yucatán's indigenous population was first exposed to Europeans after a party of Spanish shipwreck survivors came ashore in 1511. One of the sailors, Gonzalo Guerrero, is reported to have taken up with a local woman and started a family; he became a war captain in the Postclassic Mayan state of Chetumal. Later Spanish expeditions to the region were led by Córdoba in 1517, Grijalva in 1518, and Cortés in 1519. From 1528 to 1540, several attempts by Francisco Montejo to conquer the Yucatán failed. His son, Francisco de Montejo the Younger, fared almost as badly when he first took over: while invading Chichen Itza, he lost 150 men in a single day. European diseases, massive recruitment of native warriors from Campeche and Champoton, and internal hatred between the Xiu Maya and the lords of Cocom eventually turned the tide for Montejo the Younger. Chichen Itza was conquered by 1570. In 1542, the western Yucatán Peninsula also surrendered to him.

Historically, the population in the eastern half of the peninsula was less affected by and less integrated with Hispanic culture than the western half. In the 21st century in the Yucatán Peninsula (Mexican states of Campeche, Yucatán and Quintana Roo), between 750,000 and 1,200,000 people speak Mayan. However, three times more than that are of Maya origins, hold ancient Maya surnames, and do not speak Mayan languages as their first language.

Matthew Restall, in his book The Maya Conquistador, mentions a series of letters sent to the King of Spain in the 16th and 17th centuries. The noble Maya families at that time signed documents to the Spanish Royal Family; surnames mentioned in those letters are Pech, Camal, Xiu, Ucan, Canul, Cocom, and Tun, among others.

A large 19th-century revolt by the native Maya people of Yucatán (Mexico), known as the Caste War of Yucatán, was one of the most successful modern Native American revolts. For a period the Maya state of Chan Santa Cruz was recognized as an independent nation by the British Empire, particularly in terms of trading with British Honduras.

Francisco Luna-Kan was elected governor of the state of Yucatán from 1976 to 1982. Luna-Kan was born in Mérida, Yucatán, and he was a doctor of medicine, then a professor of medicine before his political offices. He was first appointed as overseer of the state's rural medical system. He was the first governor of the modern Yucatán Peninsula to be of full Maya ancestry. In the early 21st century, dozens of politicians, including deputies, mayors and senators, are of full or mixed Maya heritage from the Yucatán Peninsula.

According to the National Institute of Geography and Informatics (Mexico's INEGI), in Yucatán State there were 1.2 million Mayan speakers in 2009, representing 59.5% of the inhabitants. Due to this, the cultural section of the government of Yucatán began on-line classes for grammar and proper pronunciation of Maya.

Maya people from Yucatán Peninsula living in the United States of America have been organizing Maya language lessons and Maya cooking classes since 2003 in California and other states: clubs of Yucatec Maya are registered in Dallas and Irving, Texas; Salt Lake City in Utah; Las Vegas, Nevada; and California, with groups in San Francisco, San Rafael, Chino, Pasadena, Santa Ana, Garden Grove, Inglewood, Los Angeles, Thousand Oaks, Oxnard, San Fernando Valley and Whittier.  Maya language is taught at the college and graduate level; beginning, intermediate, and advanced courses in Maya have been taught at Indiana University since 2010.  The Open School of Ethnography and Anthropology offers immersion Maya courses in a six week intensive summer program

Chiapas

Chiapas was for many years one of the regions of Mexico that was least touched by the reforms of the Mexican Revolution. The Zapatista Army of National Liberation, launched a rebellion against the Mexican state, Chiapas in January 1994, declared itself to be an indigenous movement and drew its strongest and earliest support from Chiapan Maya. Today its number of supporters is relevant. (see also the EZLN and the Chiapas conflict)

Maya groups in Chiapas include the Tzotzil and Tzeltal, in the highlands of the state, the Tojolabalis concentrated in the lowlands around Las Margaritas, and the Chʼol in the jungle. (see map)

The most traditional of Maya groups are the Lacandon, a small population avoiding contact with outsiders until the late 20th century by living in small groups in the Lacandon Jungle. These Lacandon Maya came from the Campeche/Petén area (north-east of Chiapas) and moved into the Lacandon rain-forest at the end of the 18th century.

In the course of the 20th century, and increasingly in the 1950s and 1960s, other people (mainly the Maya and subsistence peasants from the highlands), also entered into the Lacandon region; initially encouraged by the government. This immigration led to land-related conflicts and an increasing pressure on the rainforest. To halt the migration, the government decided in 1971 to declare a large part of the forest (614,000 hectares, or 6140 km2) a protected area: the Montes Azules Biosphere Reserve. They appointed only one small population group (the 66 Lacandon families) as tenants (thus creating the Lacandon Community), thereby displacing 2000 Tzeltal and Chʼol families from 26 communities, and leaving non-Lacandon communities dependent on the government for granting their rights to land. In the decades that followed the government carried out numerous programs to keep the problems in the region under control, using land distribution as a political tool; as a way of ensuring loyalty from different campesino groups. This strategy of divide and rule led to great disaffection and tensions among population groups in the region.
(see also the Chiapas conflict and the Lacandon Jungle).

Belize

The Maya population in Belize is concentrated in the Corozal, Cayo, Toledo and Orange Walk districts, but they are scattered throughout the country. The Maya are thought to have been in Belize and the Yucatán region since the second millennium BC. Much of Belize's original Maya population died as a result of new infectious diseases and conflicts between tribes and with Europeans. They are divided into the Yucatec, Kekchi, and Mopan. These three Maya groups now inhabit the country.

The Yucatec Maya (many of whom came from Yucatán, Mexico to escape the Caste War of the 1840s) there have been evidence of several Yucatec Maya groups living by the Yalbac area of Belize and in the Orange Walk district near the present day Lamanai at the time the British reach. The Mopan (indigenous to Belize but were forced out by the British; they returned from Guatemala to evade slavery in the 19th century), and Kekchi (also fled from slavery in Guatemala in the 19th century). The later groups are chiefly found in the Toledo District.

Tabasco

The Mexican state of Tabasco is home to the Chontal Maya. Tabasco is a Mexican state with a northern coastline fringing the Gulf of Mexico. In its capital, Villahermosa, Parque Museo la Venta is known for its zoo and colossal stone sculptures dating to the Olmec civilization. The grand Museo de Historia de Tabasco chronicles the area from prehistoric times, while the Museo Regional de Antropología has exhibits on native Maya and Olmec civilizations.

Guatemala

In Guatemala, indigenous people of Maya descent comprise around 42% of the population. Despite the population size, it is reported that many still experience discrimination and oppression. The largest and most traditional Maya populations are in the western highlands in the departments of Baja Verapaz, Quiché, Totonicapán, Huehuetenango, Quetzaltenango, and San Marcos; their inhabitants are mostly Maya.

The Maya people of the Guatemala highlands include the Achi, Akatek, Chuj, Ixil, Jakaltek, Kaqchikel, Kʼicheʼ, Mam, Poqomam, Poqomchiʼ, Qʼanjobʼal, Qʼeqchiʼ, Tzʼutujil and Uspantek.

The Qʼeqchiʼ live in lowland areas of Alta Vera Paz, Peten, and Western Belize. Over the course of the succeeding centuries a series of land displacements, re-settlements, persecutions and migrations resulted in a wider dispersal of Qʼeqchiʼ communities, into other regions of Guatemala (Izabal, Petén, El Quiché). They are the 2nd largest ethnic Maya group in Guatemala (after the Kʼicheʼ) and one of the largest and most widespread throughout Central America.

In Guatemala, the Spanish colonial pattern of keeping the native population legally separate and subservient continued well into the 20th century. This resulted in many traditional customs being retained, as the only other option than traditional Maya life open to most Maya was entering the Hispanic culture at the very bottom rung. Because of this many Guatemalan Maya, especially women, continue to wear traditional clothing, that varies according to their specific local identity.

The southeastern region of Guatemala (bordering with Honduras) includes groups such as the Chʼortiʼ. The northern lowland Petén region includes the Itza, whose language is near extinction but whose agroforestry practices, including use of dietary and medicinal plants may still tell us much about pre-colonial management of the Maya lowlands.

Genocide in Guatemala 

The 36 year long Guatemalan Civil War left more than 200,000 people dead, half a million driven from their homes, and at least 100,000 women raped; most of the victims were Maya.

The genocide against Mayan people took place throughout the whole civil war because indigenous people were seen as supporting the leftist guerillas, but most acts against humanity occurred during Efraín Ríos Montt's presidency (1982–1983). Ríos Montt instituted a campaign of state terror intended to destroy the Mayas in the name of countering "communist subversion" and ridding the country of its indigenous culture. This was also known as Operation Sofia. Within Operation Sofia, the military followed through with "scorched earth policies" which allowed them to destroy whole villages, including killing livestock, destroying cultural symbols, destroying crops, and murdering civilians. In some areas, government forces killed about 40% of the total population; the campaign destroyed at least 626 Mayan villages.

On January 26, 2012, former president Ríos Montt was formally indicted in Guatemala for overseeing the massacre of 1,771 civilians of the Ixil Maya group and appeared in court for genocide and crimes against humanity for which he was then sentenced to 80 years in prison on May 10, 2013. This ruling was overturned by the constitutional court on May 20, 2013, over alleged irregularities in the handling of the case. The ex-president appeared in court again on January 5, 2015, amongst protest from his lawyers regarding his health conditions and on August 25, 2015, it was deliberated that a re-trial of the 2013 proceedings could find Ríos Montt guilty or not, but that the sentence would be suspended. Ríos Montt died on April 1, 2018, of a heart attack.

Maya heritage

The Maya people are known for their brightly colored, yarn-based, textiles that are woven into capes, shirts, blouses, huipiles and dresses. Each village has its own distinctive pattern, making it possible to distinguish a person's home town. Women's clothing consists of a shirt and a long skirt.

The Maya religion is Roman Catholicism combined with the indigenous Maya religion to form the unique syncretic religion which prevailed throughout the country and still does in the rural regions prior to 2010s of "orthodoxing" the western rural areas by Christian Orthodox missionaries. Beginning from negligible roots prior to 1960s, however, Protestant Pentecostalism has grown to become the predominant religion of Guatemala City and other urban centers, later to 2010s that almost of all Maya of several rural areas of West Guatemala, living rural areas were mostly mass converted from Catholicism or possibly Maya religion due of various reasons to either Eastern or Oriental Orthodoxy by late Fr. Andres Giron and some other Orthodox missionaries, and also smaller to mid-sized towns also slowly converted as well since 2013. The unique religion is reflected in the local saint, Maximón, who is associated with the subterranean force of masculine fertility and prostitution. Always depicted in black, he wears a black hat and sits on a chair, often with a cigar placed in his mouth and a gun in his hand, with offerings of tobacco, alcohol, and Coca-Cola at his feet. The locals know him as San Simon of Guatemala.

The Popol Vuh is the most significant work of Guatemalan literature in the Kʼicheʼ language, and one of the most important works of Pre-Columbian American literature. It is a compendium of Maya stories and legends, aimed to preserve Maya traditions. The first known version of this text dates from the 16th century and is written in Quiché transcribed in Latin characters. It was translated into Spanish by the Dominican priest Francisco Ximénez in the beginning of the 18th century. Due to its combination of historical, mythical, and religious elements, it has been called the Maya Bible. It is a vital document for understanding the culture of Pre-Columbian America. The Rabinal Achí is a dramatic work consisting of dance and text that is preserved as it was originally represented. It is thought to date from the 15th century and narrates the mythical and dynastic origins of the Toj Kʼicheʼ rulers of Rabinal, and their relationships with neighboring Kʼicheʼ of Qʼumarkaj. The Rabinal Achí is performed during the Rabinal festival of January 25, the day of Saint Paul. It was declared a masterpiece of oral tradition of humanity by UNESCO in 2005. The 16th century saw the first native-born Guatemalan writers that wrote in Spanish.

First wave of migration 
Due to the war in Guatemala, many Maya people were killed. The two parties in the war were both hurting the basic living circumstances of Maya people by destroying infrastructure, such as railroads, farmlands, factories, they also burned most of the Mayan books. The destruction of these basic tools created a very difficult environment for Maya people to make a living. Without a way to sustain themselves, many Maya people decided to move somewhere that they were able to live. Many people moved to Mexico and some moved to the United States, which was also their first encounter with the US. Many Mayans who moved to the US mainly moved to areas like Florida, Houston, and Los Angeles.

Second wave of migration 
After the peace agreement among both parties in Guatemala after a 36-year war, the two parties built a new government. But the new government is also not protecting the benefit of people, especially the native people like Maya people. The new government was trying to unite all the culture together which in another word, is trying to assimilate all the culture within Maya people. In addition, the new government was not only trying to eliminate the culture but also was keeping the lands to itself rather than gave them back to the Maya people. Without a way to grow crops and food, Maya people were in extreme poverty. They have to find a way to make a living which they started the second migration movement to the United States.

Maya cultural heritage tourism

There is often a relationship between cultural heritage, tourism, and a national identity. In the case of the Maya, the many national identities have been constructed because of the growing demands placed on them by cultural tourism.  By focusing on lifeways through costumes, rituals, diet, handicrafts, language, housing, or other features, the identity of the economy shifts from the sale of labor to that of the sale of culture.

Global tourism is now considered one of the largest scale movement of goods, services, and people in history and a significant catalyst for economic development and sociopolitical change.  Estimated that between 35 and 40 percent of tourism today is represented by cultural tourism or heritage tourism, this alternative to mass tourism offers opportunities for place-based engagement that frames context for interaction by the lived space and everyday life of other peoples, as well as sites and objects of global historical significance. In this production of tourism the use of historic symbols, signs, and topics form a new side that characterizes a nation and can play an active role in nation building.

With this type of tourism, people argue that ethno-commerce may open unprecedented opportunities for creating value of various kinds. Tourists travel with cultural expectations, which has created a touristic experience sometimes faced with the need to invent traditions of artificial and contrived attractions, often developed at the expense of local tradition and meanings.

An example of this can be seen in "Mayanizing Tourism on Roatan Island, Honduras: Archaeological Perspectives on Heritage, Development, and Indignity."  Alejandro J. Figueroa et al., combine archaeological data and ethnographic insights to explore a highly contested tourism economy in their discussion of how places on Roatan Island, Honduras, have become increasingly "Mayanized" over the past decade.  As tour operators and developers continue to invent an idealized Maya past for the island, non-Maya archaeological remains and cultural patrimony are constantly being threatened and destroyed.  While heritage tourism provides economic opportunities for some, it can devalue contributions made by less familiar groups.

Notable Maya people

 Ah Ahaual, a 7th-century captive of noble lineage recorded in pre-Columbian Maya inscriptions
 Hunac Ceel (fl. c. 1300), Maya general and founder of the Cocom dynasty at Chichen Itzá
 Apoxpalon (fl. 1525), Maya merchant and regional ruler of Itzamkanac
 Tecun Uman (died c. 1524), legendary Kʼicheʼ Mayan leader who refused to give way to the conquistadors in Guatemala and was slain by Pedro de Alvarado
 Napuc Chi or Ah Kin Chi (died c. 1541), general-in-chief of the army and king of Tutul-Xiu, i. e. Maní
 Gaspar Antonio Chi (c. 1531–1610), Maya noble from Maní, son of Napuc Chi
 Jacinto Canek (c. 1731–1761), Maya revolutionary
 Crescencio Poot (1820–1885), general in the Caste War of Yucatán
 Felipe Carrillo Puerto (1874–1924), Mexican journalist and politician, governor of the Mexican state of Yucatán (1922–1924)
 Andrés Curruchich (1891–1969), Guatemalan painter of the Kaqchikel people
 Carlos Mérida (1891–1985), Spanish-Kʼicheʼ artist from Guatemala
 Francisco Luna Kan (born 1925), Mexican politician, governor of Yucatán (1976–1982)
 Armando Manzanero Canché (1935-2020), Mexican musician, singer, and composer
 Luis Rolando Ixquiac Xicara (born 1947), indigenous artist born in Quetzaltenango, Guatemala
 Marcial Mes (c. 1949–2014), Belizean politician
 Rosalina Tuyuc (born 1956), Guatemalan human rights activist
 Rigoberta Menchú (born 1959), Kʼicheʼ political activist from Guatemala
 Comandanta Ramona (1959–2006), 'officer' of the autonomist Zapatista Army of National Liberation
 Juan Jose Pacho (born 1963), Mexican former baseball player and manager
 Aníbal López (1964–2014), Guatemalan artist
 Jesús Tecú Osorio (born 1971), Guatemalan social activist
 Cadex Herrera (born 1974), Belizean Artist
 Hilario Chi Canul (born 1981), Mexican linguist
 Oscar Santis (born 1999), Footballer

Quotes

 "We are not myths of the past, ruins in the jungle or zoos. We are people and we want to be respected, not to be victims of intolerance and racism." – Rigoberta Menchú, 1992.

Films and television
 Kings of the Sun (1963), the first major motion picture that depicted a part of Maya history, in this case the conquest of Chichen Itza by Hunac Ceel, a famous Maya general.
 El Norte (film) (1983), one of the first indie films ever produced, about two Maya siblings who immigrate illegally to the U.S. to escape the Maya genocide in Guatemala.
 Apocalypto (2006), an adventure film directed and produced by Mel Gibson, set around the time of European contact with all of the dialogue spoken in Yucatec.
 Breaking the Maya Code (2008), a documentary that outlines the work of linguists who deciphered the ancient Maya script. 
 The Forgotten District (2008), a documentary on Maya ecotourism in southern Belize.
 Heart of Sky, Heart of Earth (2011), a documentary on the Maya of today and their fight to save their culture and environment.
 Mayan Renaissance (2012), starring Rigoberta Menchú.
 Ixcanul (2015), the first movie ever produced completely in Kaqchikel, a Maya language. It's an indie film that relates the life of a young woman in a traditional Maya village. 
 La Llorona (2019), a horror film addressing the genocide of the Maya in Guatemala.
 Sons of Anarchy and its sequel spin-off series, Mayans M.C., both FX series, created by Kurt Sutter, feature a fictional Latino outlaw motorcycle club that adopts much of the culture of Mayan civilization, reflective in the club's name, the club's patch, and the terminology used by members.
 Black Panther: Wakanda Forever (2022), adventure film sequel with elements of the story of a superhuman Mayan tribe with ancestors from the Mesoamerica jungle

See also

 Acala Chʼol
 Chinamita
 Genetic history of indigenous peoples of the Americas
 Indigenous peoples of the Americas
 Kejache
 Lakandon Chʼol
 List of Mayan languages
 Manche Chʼol

References

Bibliography

 
 
 
Mooney, James, 
Restall, Matthew (1997). The Maya World. Yucatecan Culture and Society, 1550–1850. Stanford: Stanford University Press. .

Further reading

External links

 
Indigenous culture of the Americas
Ethnic groups in Belize
Ethnic groups in Mexico
Ethnic groups in Guatemala
Ethnic groups in Honduras
Ethnic groups in El Salvador
Articles containing video clips